The University of Massachusetts Lowell Marching Band has about 120 members and is directed by Daniel Lutz and assisted by Debra-Nicole Huber. The band acts as an exhibition band for the University of Massachusetts Lowell, performing for the Massachusetts Instrumental and Choral Conductors Association (MICCA), New England Scholastic Band Association (NESBA) and Musical Arts Conference (MAC) shows throughout Massachusetts, New Hampshire and Connecticut. The band also frequently performs at events on campus and in surrounding communities, including parades.

In recent years, the band has performed hits from classic rock and jazz artists such as Queen, Led Zeppelin, The Beatles and Chick Corea, arranged by Lutz and percussion arranger Peter Furnari.

History

The UMass Lowell Marching Band draws its members from virtually every department in each of the university's schools and colleges. The band has been a major ensemble of the Department of Music since 1979.

In its role as ambassador for the university, the marching band performs throughout New England at parades, clinics, exhibitions, and serves as an ambassador for the at university and serves as a source of entertainment at university activities. Past performances included exhibitions for United States President Bill Clinton, also for Governors of Massachusetts, and other state dignitaries as well as at band festivals and televised performances seen by audiences of thousands. 

The marching band's musical program is specially arranged for the ensemble, drawn from the classics, jazz, rock and popular idioms. Music and motion are combined through original visual design. The band consists of instrumentalists, including guitar, bass and synthesizer. The band does not have a color guard.

In the Fall of 2020, due to the COVID-19 pandemic, the band's rehearsals were held virtually through Zoom, concluding with a video performance for a limited audience of UMass Lowell music students. For this virtual season, the band's numbers were a fraction of the size from years prior.

Instrumentation
The instrumentation consists of piccolos, alto saxophones, tenor saxophones, trumpets, mellophone, trombones, baritones, sousaphone, and a variety of percussion instruments.

Staff

Daniel Lutz – director and wind arranger
Debra-Nicole Huber – associate director
Peter Furnari – percussion arranger
Gilles Ouellette – visual designer
Eric Linsner – music instructor
Josh Chapman – visual caption head
Chris Fendt – visual instructor
Shah Salmi – visual instructor
Jim Morris – percussion caption head
Jim Felker - percussion instructor
Kevin Griffin - percussion instructor
Kristen Sardynski – percussion instructor
Mike Newman – pit instructor

Student leaders
2021 - Kyle Watson- field conductor, Sarah McGregor- assistant field conductor, Matt Schwamb - drum captain
2020 - Kyle Watson - field conductor, Jackson Winders - assistant field conductor
2019 - Josh Walsh- field conductor, Kyle Watson - assistant field conductor, Eli Silverstein - drum captain
2018 - Josh Walsh- field conductor, Trevor Poulin - assistant field conductor, Mathieu Bruneau - drum captain
2017 - Michael Powderly- field conductor, Josh Carter - assistant field conductor, Matthew Vayanos - drum captain
2016 - Michael Powderly- field conductor, Josh Carter - assistant field conductor, Matthew Vayanos - drum captain
2015 - Kevin Goddu - field conductor, Michael Powderly - assistant field conductor, Ryan Enos - drum captain
2014 - Kenneth Poore - field conductor, Miguel Landestoy - assistant field conductor, Kevin Goddu - assistant field conductor, Ryan Enos - drum captain
2013 – Kenneth Poore – field conductor, Miguel Landestoy – assistant field conductor, Matthew Bruce - drum captain
2012 – James Ham – field conductor, Kenneth Poore – assistant field conductor, Kevin Griffin - drum captain
2011 – Kevin Webb – field conductor, James Ham – assistant field conductor, Kevin Griffin - drum captain
2010 – Andy Chau – field conductor, James Ham – assistant field conductor, David Grant - drum captain
2009 – Andy Chau – field conductor, Kevin Webb – assistant field conductor
2008 – Anthony Beatrice – field conductor, Andy Chau – assistant field conductor
2007 – Anthony Beatrice – field conductor, Joshua Conover – assistant field conductor
2006 – Matt Perez – field conductor, Anthony Beatrice – assistant field conductor
2005 – Matt Perez – field conductor, Steve Lee – assistant field conductor
2004 – Theresa Sabina – field conductor, Matt Perez – assistant field conductor
2003 – Mike Reidy – field conductor, Theresa Sabina – assistant field conductor
2002 – Mike Reidy – field conductor, Ellen Campbell – assistant field conductor, Alexis Guay – color guard captain
2001 – Greg Davis – field conductor, Mike Reidy – assistant field conductor, Holly Sullivan – color guard captain
2000 – Aaron Goldberg – field conductor, Greg Davis – assistant field conductor
1999 – Aaron Goldberg – field conductor
1998 – Brendan LaFlamme – field conductor, Jamie Knapp – color guard captain

1994-Jim Felker - field conductor, Heather Erickson-assistant field conductor
1993-Jim Felker - field conductor, Karen Consalvi-assistant field conductor
1992 - Jim Felker - field conductor, Karen Consalvi-assistant field conductor

Shows

2021 - The Music of Chick Corea - My Spanish Heart, La Fiesta/Celebration Suite, Spain, Night Streets, Central Park, The Musician, Spanish Fantasy (Part 4)
2020 - Liberty Fanfare/The Mission - John Williams, Malagueña (Ernesto Lecuona)
2019 - The Music of The Beatles - Eleanor Rigby, Little Help From My Friends, Norwegian Wood, Magical Mystery Tour, Penny Lane, Got to Get You Into My Life, Revolution, The Long and Winding Road, Something, Hey Jude, The End
2018 - 40th Anniversary - Part One: Now or Never (New York Voices), Santorini (Yanni), First Circle (Pat Metheny), Part Two: Third Wind (Pat Metheny), Meet the Flintstones (Hoyt Curtin), Bohemian Rhapsody (Queen), Minuano (Pat Metheny), Part Three: Baroque Samba (New York Voices), Central Park (Chick Corea), Birdland (Weather Report), Part Four: La Fiesta/Celebration Suite (Chick Corea), Malagueña (Ernesto Lecuona)
2017 - Music of Chase - Open Up Wide, Bochawa, Weird Song, Invitation To A River, Get It On
2016 - Time for a Change - First Circle- Pat Metheny, Reflections of Earth- Gavin Greenaway, Blue Rondo ala Turk /Take Five- Dave Brubeck, Whiplash- Don Ellis
2015 - Music of Led Zeppelin - Kashmir, Bolero, Black Dog, Four Sticks, Dazed and Confused, Fool in the Rain, Stairway To Heaven, Whole Lotta Love
2014 – Music of Queen – Bicycle Race, Somebody to Love, Killer Queen, Bohemian Rhapsody
2013 – The Music of Santana – All I Ever Wanted, Dance Sister Dance, Smooth, She's Not There/Black Magic Woman, Everybody's Everything
2012 – The Music of Emerson, Lake & Palmer and Yes - Fanfare for the Common Man, Karn Evil 9, Piano Concerto #2, From the Beginning, Changes, I've Seen All People, Roundabout
2011 – Music of The Who – Selections from Tommy, Won't Get Fooled Again, Reign O'er Me, Who Are You
2010 – Music of Rush – The Camera Eye, Limelight, Roll the Bones, Subdivisions, Tom Sawyer
2009 – A Spanish Fantasy – Music of Chick Corea – Concierto de Aranjuez/Celebration Suite, Central Park, My Spanish Heart, Spanish Fantasy Part IV/La Fiesta/Celebration Suite
2008 – Latin Laced Rhythm and Blues – Faces/Free, In the Stone, God Bless the Child, Malagueña
2007 – Music of Queen – Bicycle Race, Somebody to Love, Killer Queen, Bohemian Rhapsody
2006 – Music of Sting
2005 – Music of Pat Metheny – Imaginary Day, Heat of the Day, Beat 70, Minuano
2004 – Music of Phil Collins- Los Endos Suite, The West Side, Chips & Salsa
2003 – Channel One Suite – Bill Reddie, Third Wind – Pat Metheny
2002 – Tapestry of Nations – Gavin Greenaway, Reflections of Earth – Gavin Greenaway, Minuano – Pat Metheny, First Circle – Pat Metheny
2001 – Day One, Santorini, Baroque Samba, Episode, Back Home
2000 – Los Endos Suite – Phil Collins, Night Streets – Chick Corea, Concierto de Aranjuez – Chick Corea, La Fiesta/Celebration Suite – Chick Corea
1999 – Threshold – Patrick Williams, Spring – Matrix, The Musician – Chick Corea, Malagueña – Ernesto Lecuona
1998 – Malagueña – Ernesto Lecuona, Central Park – Chick Corea, My Spanish Heart – Chick Corea, Third Wind – Pat Metheny
1986 - Living in the Past - Ian Anderson, The Long and Winding Road - Lennon–McCartney, Meet the Flintstones - Hoyt Curtin
1985 - First Circle - Pat Metheny, Mata Hari - Al Di Meola, Olé - Slide Hampton, Starlight Express - Andrew Lloyd Webber, Get it On - Bill Chase & Terry Richards
1984 - The Musician - Chick Corea; West Side; The Devil is a Liar - Seawind; Percussion Feature: Spanish Fantasy; The Long and Winding Road - Lennon-McCartney
1983 - Eleanor Rigby - Lennon-McCartney; On the Boulevard - Manhattan Transfer; Hard to Say I'm Sorry/Get Away - Chicago; Percussion Feature: Reground to Six
1982 - Music from Carmina Burana - Carl Orff; Corazòn - Carole King; Cuernos - Dan Lutz
1981 - Go Back Home; Smiling Phases - Blood, Sweat and Tears; The One That You Love - Air Supply; Whiplash
1980 - Howard Hanson: 2nd Symphony; In the Stone - Earth, Wind and Fire; I'm Running
1979 - Malagueña; Music from "SWAT"; Theme from "The Fox"; Ride, Captain Ride; Pavane; Marianne

References

External links
University of Massachusetts Lowell Marching Band

College marching bands in the United States
Marching Band
Musical groups established in 1979
1979 establishments in Massachusetts